Giovanni Liverzani (5 May 1933 – 4 July 2013) was an Italian pistol shooter. He competed in the 25 m rapid-fire pistol event at the 1964, 1968 and 1972 Olympics with the best achievement of sixth place in 1972. At the world championships Liverzani won a team bronze in 1962 and both individual and team gold medals in 1970, setting a world record. He retired in 1974.

References

External links
 

1933 births
2013 deaths
Italian male sport shooters
Olympic shooters of Italy
Shooters at the 1964 Summer Olympics
Shooters at the 1968 Summer Olympics
Shooters at the 1972 Summer Olympics
Sportspeople from Vicenza
20th-century Italian people